Jimmy Boyle (born 19 February 1967) is a Scottish football player and coach who is currently the assistant manager of Cove Rangers. He is best known for the eight years he spent with the original Airdrieonians, and the manager of new Airdrieonians from 2010–2013. He played in two Scottish Cup Finals in his time with the original Airdrieonians.

Having managed the Airdrie Under-19s at the club for several years, he succeeded Kenny Black as interim first team manager in July 2010, with the appointment being made permanent in September 2010. Boyle was sacked in October 2013, with the team bottom of the 2013–14 Scottish League One table.

Boyle moved into a role within the Scottish Football Association before being appointed Dundee F.C. Head of Youth Development in April 2016. He was appointed Dundee assistant manager in October 2018 under manager Jim McIntyre, but he was sacked on 12 May 2019 after the club had been relegated from the Premiership.

In June 2022, Boyle would return to football with McIntyre as his assistant manager with Scottish Championship side Cove Rangers.

Manager statistics

Honours

Player
Airdrieonians
Scottish Challenge Cup 1994–95

Livingston
Scottish Second Division 1998–99

Alloa Athletic
Scottish Challenge Cup 1999–2000 

Cowdenbeath
Scottish Third Division promotion 2000–01

Manager

Airdrieonians
Scottish Second Division promotion 2011–2012

See also
 List of footballers in Scotland by number of league appearances (500+)

References

External links

Soccerbase manager profile

1967 births
Airdrieonians F.C. (1878) players
Airdrieonians F.C. managers
Airdrieonians F.C. players
Alloa Athletic F.C. players
Celtic F.C. players
Cowdenbeath F.C. players
Living people
Livingston F.C. players
Partick Thistle F.C. players
Queen's Park F.C. players
Scottish Football League managers
Scottish Football League players
Scottish footballers
Scottish Professional Football League managers
Footballers from Glasgow
Association football midfielders
Dundee F.C. non-playing staff
Scottish football managers